Giró Nunatak is a nunatak  northwest of Vaca Nunatak in the Panzarini Hills portion of the Argentina Range, in the Pensacola Mountains of Antarctica. It was mapped by the United States Geological Survey from surveys and U.S. Navy air photos, 1956–67, and was named by the Advisory Committee on Antarctic Names for Captain G.A. Giró, an Argentine officer in charge of General Belgrano Station, winter 1965.

References

Nunataks of Queen Elizabeth Land